A ramo was a warrior-leader among certain tribes on Malaita in the Solomon Islands.

Ramo may also refer to:

People
Rämö (surname), a Finnish surname
Joshua Cooper Ramo (born 1968), American businessperson
Simon Ramo (1913–2016), American physicist and engineer

Other uses
Productos Ramo, Colombian company
Ramo, a modification of the ASM-N-6 Omar air-to-surface missile
Ramo (TV series), a Turkish drama-series

See also

Ramo language (disambiguation)
Ramos (disambiguation)